Bruno Girard (born November 25, 1970 in Blois, France) was a French boxer (187 cm height) at super middleweight and light heavyweight division who held the Lineal and WBA super middleweight titles.

Professional boxing career
The light-hitting Girard turned pro in 1991 and challenged Byron Mitchell for WBA and Lineal Super Middleweight Titles in 1999, in his first US fight. The fight was a draw, and in the rematch in 2000 Girard won a unanimous decision to win the titles.
Girard defended the belt once against Manny Siaca and then was stripped of the title for declining a rematch.

In late 2001 he moved up to light heavyweight and took on southpaw Lou Del Valle for the Vacant WBA Light Heavyweight Title and drew with him. Later that year, he took on Robert Koon for the Vacant belt, and won via TKO.
He defended the belt twice before losing to Mehdi Sahnoune via 7th-round TKO in 2003. Girard retired after the bout.

Professional boxing record

See also
List of super middleweight boxing champions
List of WBA world champions

References

External links 
 
Bruno Girard - CBZ Profile

|-

|-

1970 births
Living people
World boxing champions
French male boxers
Super-middleweight boxers
Sportspeople from Jerusalem